Concord is a census-designated place in Jefferson County, Alabama, United States. At the 2010 census the population was 1,837, up from 1,809 in 2000. It is northwest from the Birmingham suburb of Hueytown.

Geography
Concord is located at  (33.469092, -87.038163).

Demographics

2020 census

As of the 2020 United States census, there were 1,690 people, 631 households, and 501 families residing in the CDP.

2010 census
As of the census of 2010, there were 1,837 people, 817 households, and 573 families residing in the CDP. The racial makeup of the CDP was 98.34% White, 0.28% Black or African American, 0.55% Native American, 0.22% Asian, 0.28% from other races, and 0.33% from two or more races. 0.28% of the population were Hispanic or Latino of any race.

There were 754 households, out of which 27.8% had children under the age of 18 living with them, 66.5% were married couples living together, 7.6% had a female householder with no husband present, and 24.0% were non-families. 22.6% of all households were made up of individuals, and 12.1% had someone living alone who was 65 years of age or older. The average household size was 2.40 and the average family size was 2.81.

In the CDP, the population was spread out, with 19.8% under the age of 18, 7.5% from 18 to 24, 27.4% from 25 to 44, 27.2% from 45 to 64, and 18.1% who were 65 years of age or older. The median age was 42 years. For every 100 females, there were 91.0 males. For every 100 females age 18 and over, there were 88.3 males.

The median income for a household in the CDP was $63,150, and the median income for a family was $55,129. Males had a median income of $35,825 versus $26,406 for females. The per capita income for the CDP was $24,490. About 1.5% of families and 2.4% of the population were below the poverty line, including none of those under age 18 and 8.0% of those age 65 or over.

References

Census-designated places in Jefferson County, Alabama
Census-designated places in Alabama
Birmingham metropolitan area, Alabama